Gulen is a fjord in Bremanger Municipality in Vestland county, Norway. The fjord empties into the Frøysjøen strait (on the west end) and to the east, it splits into three branches: Nordgulen, Midtgulen, and Sørgulen. The Svelgen river is one of the primary inflows of the fjord.

See also
 List of Norwegian fjords

References

Fjords of Vestland
Bremanger